Allan Knorr (23 September 1927 – 28 October 2002) was an Australian rules footballer who played for the Collingwood Football Club in the Victorian Football League (VFL).

Notes

External links 
		
Profile on Collingwood Forever

2002 deaths
1927 births
Australian rules footballers from Victoria (Australia)
Collingwood Football Club players
Ivanhoe Amateurs Football Club players